Yasmin Javadian (born 15 November 2000) is a judoka from Northern Ireland.

Judo career
In 2021, Javadian became champion of Great Britain, winning the half-lightweight division at the British Judo Championships The following year she won the bronze medal at the 2022 Commonwealth Games, in the women's 52 kg category.

References

2000 births
Living people
Female judoka from Northern Ireland
Commonwealth Games bronze medallists for Northern Ireland
Commonwealth Games medallists in judo
Judoka at the 2022 Commonwealth Games
Medallists at the 2022 Commonwealth Games